Neeme is an Estonian-language male given name.

People named Neeme include:
Neeme Järvi (born 1937), conductor
Neeme Ruus (1911–1942), politician
Neeme Suur (born 1969), politician
Neeme Väli (born 1965), Major General of the Estonian Defence League

References

Estonian masculine given names